António Joaquim Tavares Ferro (17 August 1895, Lisbon - 11 November 1956, Lisbon) was a Portuguese writer, journalist and politician, associated with the Estado Novo.

Biography
In 1915, when he was barely 19, his friend, Mário de Sá Carneiro, appointed him as editor of the magazine Orpheu, precisely because he was still a minor. This position did not last long, however, as Sá Carneiro's father withdrew his financial support after only two issues. During the 1920s, he became a reporter for O Século and the Diário de Lisboa, was briefly Director of the Illustração Portugueza and served as an international correspondent for Diário de Notícias.
 
He also contributed prose and poetry to several literary journals. In 1920, he published one of his best known works, a collection of aphorisms and "paradoxes" called the Teoria da Indiferença (Theory of Indifference). He also produced a self-described "fragmentary novel", Leviana (Frivolous) and, in 1921, created Nós (We), a Modernist manifesto. Ferro became famous in 1926 as the journalist who solved the murder of the actress Maria Alves.

Having begun as a member of the Portuguese Republican Party, he evolved into a Sidonista and supporter of authoritarian regimes, reflected in his book of interviews, Viagem à Volta das Ditaduras (Journey Around the Dictatorships, 1927). He especially admired Benito Mussolini, who he interviewed three times in Rome. Adolf Hitler and Primo de Rivera also granted him brief interviews.
  
Early in 1932, he suggested to Salazar that an organization should be established to advertise the achievements of his regime and promote its programs. Later that year, he began publishing a series of interviews with Salazar in the Diário de Notícias, which were gathered into a book in 1933: Salazar, o Homem e a Obra (The Man and His Work). His political career took off in earnest when he was appointed Director  of the "Secretariado da Propaganda Nacional" (SPN) later that year. After World War II, the organization's name was changed to the "Secretariado Nacional de Informação" (SNI). He remained its Director until 1949, when he joined the Portuguese legation in Bern.

During those years he was involved in a wide variety of cultural activities in addition to the more blatant propaganda screeds. He served as Commissioner-General for international exhibitions in Paris (1937) and New York (1939), played a major role in organizing the "Exposição do Mundo Português" of 1940, and directed production of the associated Revista dos Centenários, a propaganda journal that ran for 24 issues and included contributions from such notables as Vitorino Nemésio, Júlio Dantas and Aquilino Ribeiro. He was also involved in creating the Museu de Arte Popular and the "Companhia Portuguesa de Bailado Verde-Gaio", a dance company that performed from 1940 to 1977. The Pousadas de Portugal were created through his initiatives.

In 1954, he transferred to the legation in Rome. Two years later, he died of an infection following minor surgery.

Selected works

In English
 Salazar: Portugal and Her Leader, translated by H. de Barros Gomes and John Gibbons with a preface by Sir Austen Chamberlain. Faber & Faber limited, 1939

In Portuguese
 Teoria da Indiferença (1920), 3rd Edition, Roger Delraux, 1979. 
 Leviana (1921), Novela em fragmentos com um estudo crítico do author, 4th Edition, Roger Delraux, 1979.
 Gabriele d'Annunzio e Eu (1922)
 A Idade do Jazz-Band (1923), 2nd Edition, Portugalia, 1924.
 Batalha de Flores (1923), reprint, Europress, 1988. 
 A Amadora dos Fenómenos (1925), Ediçiones Civilização
 Viagem à Volta das Ditaduras (1927), Ediçao da Emprêsa Diario de noticias
 Salazar, o Homem e a Obra (1933), reprint, F. Pereira, 1982
 Homens e Multidões (1941), 2nd Edition, J. Olympio, 1950
 D. Manuel II, o Desventurado (1954), Livreria Bertrand.

References

Further reading 
 Orlando Raimundo. António Ferro: O Inventor do Salazarismo, Leya, 2015. 
 Margarida Acciaiuoli. António Ferro, a Vertigem da Palavra. Retórica, Política e Propaganda no Estado Novo., Bizâncio, 2013,  
 Mafalda Ferro and Rita Ferro. Retrato de uma família: Fernanda de Castro, António Ferro, António Quadros. Lisboa, Círculo de Leitores, 1999. 
 Fernando Guedes. António Ferro e a sua Política do Espírito. Lisboa, Academia Portuguesa da História, 1997. 
 Ernesto Castro Leal. António Ferro: espaço político e imaginário social (1918-32), Edições Cosmos, 1994.

External links 

 First page of a detailed biography @ the Fundação António Quadros. 
 António Ferro on Facebook.
 "A Matriz de António Ferro" by Carlos Fontes @ Política.
 Archived issues of Alma Nova: revista ilustrada de propaganda algarvia with contributions by Ferro

1895 births
1956 deaths
20th-century Portuguese writers
Portuguese journalists
Male journalists
Portuguese essayists
Estado Novo (Portugal)
Portuguese propagandists
People from Lisbon
20th-century essayists
20th-century journalists
Presidents of the Portuguese Tennis Federation